Juan Antonio Menéndez Fernández (6 January 1957 – 15 May 2019) was a Spanish Roman Catholic bishop.

Menéndez Fernández was born in Villamarín de Salcedo and was ordained to the priesthood in 1981. He served as an auxiliary bishop for the Roman Catholic Archdiocese of Oviedo, and titular bishop of Nasai from 2013 to 2015. He then served as bishop of the Roman Catholic Diocese of Astorga, from 2015 until his death in May 2019, due to a heart attack.

References

1957 births
2019 deaths
Bishops of Astorga